Noppol Pol-udom (born 22 January 1985), simply known as Tee, is a Thai professional footballer who plays as an attacking midfielder.

Club career

He previously played for Bangkok University F.C. in the 2007 AFC Champions League group stage.

Honours

Club
Bangkok University
 Thai League 1: 2006

References

External links
 Profile at Goal
https://us.soccerway.com/players/noppol-pol-udom/287809/

1985 births
Living people
Noppol Pol-udom
Noppol Pol-udom
Association football midfielders
Noppol Pol-udom
Noppol Pol-udom
Noppol Pol-udom
Noppol Pol-udom
Noppol Pol-udom
Noppol Pol-udom
Noppol Pol-udom